Comachara is a monotypic moth genus in the family Noctuidae. Its single species, Comachara cadburyi, or Cadbury's lichen moth, is found in eastern North America, including Alabama, Florida, Georgia, Kentucky, Maryland, New Jersey, New York, North Carolina, Ohio, Pennsylvania, South Carolina, Tennessee, Texas and West Virginia. Both the genus and species were first described by John G. Franclemont in 1939.

References

External links
Original description: Franclemont, J. G. (October 1939). "Comachara cadburyi, A New Genus and New Species (Lepidoptera, Phalaenidae, Sarrothripinae)". Entomological News. 50 (8): 216–218.

Acronictinae
Monotypic moth genera
Moths of North America